The Pall Mall Budget was a weekly magazine published in London from 1868 until 1920. It was a weekly digest of articles from evening newspaper The Pall Mall Gazette (1865 to 1923). The Pall Mall Budget was re-launched in 1893 by William Waldorf Astor. C. Lewis Hind was its editor from 1893 to 1895.

The full title in 1869, as displayed on the title page of Volume 2 as bound, was The PALL MALL BUDGET Being a Weekly Collection of Articles Printed in the PALL MALL GAZETTE from day to day: With a Summary of News.

References

External links 
 The Pall Mall Budget at Hathitrust Digital Library (holdings from 1869 to 1889)

News magazines published in the United Kingdom
Weekly magazines published in the United Kingdom
Defunct magazines published in the United Kingdom
Magazines published in London
Magazines established in 1868
Magazines disestablished in 1920
Budget